Band of Brothers, subtitled, E Company, 506th Regiment, 101st Airborne: From Normandy to Hitler's Eagle's Nest, by Stephen E. Ambrose is an examination of a parachute infantry company in the 101st Airborne Division in the European Theater during World War II. While the book treats the flow of battle, it concentrates on the lives of the soldiers in and associated with the company. The book was later adapted into a 2001 miniseries for HBO by Tom Hanks, Erik Jendreson, and Steven Spielberg, also titled Band of Brothers.

Background
The book rests upon interviews Ambrose conducted with former members of E Company, 2nd Battalion, 506th Parachute Infantry Regiment of the 101st Airborne Division. The veterans were having a reunion at a hotel in New Orleans, Louisiana; the interviews were conducted as part of a project to collect oral histories of D-Day for the National D-Day Museum in New Orleans. Ambrose was intrigued with the bonds that had developed among the members of Easy Company. He circulated his drafts among the surviving members of the company, asked for input, and incorporated their ideas into later drafts. Ambrose wrote of the finished product, "We have come as close to the true story of Easy Company as possible."

Notable people

 Lynn "Buck" Compton
 William "Wild Bill" Guarnere
 C. Carwood Lipton
 Don Malarkey
 Salve H. Matheson
 Warren Muck
 Lewis Nixon
 Shifty Powers
 Robert Sink
 Herbert Sobel
 Ronald Speirs
 Ed Tipper
 David Webster
 Richard D. Winters
 Robert "Popeye" Wynn
 Eugene "Doc" Roe

Contents
The book consists of a foreword, epigraph, and a maps section, followed by 19 chapters. There is an afterword and a brief author's bio after the chapters.

After the table of contents, the book's dedication reads:

To all those members of the Parachute InfantryUnited States Army, 1941-1945who wear the Purple Heart not as a decorationbut as a badge of office.

The epigraph is a quotation from Shakespeare's Henry V, from which the title of the book is derived:

From this day to the ending of the World,...we in it shall be remembered

...we few, we happy few,...we band of brothers.

The chapters are:

 One – "We Wanted Those Wings"; Camp Toccoa, July–December 1942
 Two – "Stand Up and Hook Up"; Benning, Mackall, Bragg, Shanks, December 1942-September 1943
 Three – "Duties of the Latrine Orderly"; Aldbourne, September 1943-March 1944
 Four – "Look Out Hitler! Here We Come!"; Slapton Sands, Upottery, April 1 – June 5, 1944
 Five – "Follow Me"; Normandy, June 6, 1944
 Six – "Move Out!"; Carentan, June 7 – July 12, 1944
 Seven – Healing Wounds and Scrubbed Missions; Aldbourne, July 13 – September 16, 1944
 Eight – "Hell's Highway"; Holland, September 17 – October 1, 1944
 Nine – The Island; Holland, October 2 – November 25, 1944
 Ten – Resting, Recovering, and Refitting; Mourmelon-le-Grand, November 26 – December 18, 1944
 Eleven – "They Got Us Surrounded—The Poor Bastards"; Bastogne, December 19–31, 1944
 Twelve – The Breaking Point; Bastogne, January 1–13, 1945
 Thirteen – Attack; Noville, January 14–17, 1945
 Fourteen – The Patrol; Haguenau, January 18 – February 23, 1945
 Fifteen – "The Best Feeling in the World"; Mourmelon, February 25 – April 2, 1945
 Sixteen – Getting to Know the Enemy; Germany, April 2–30, 1945
 Seventeen – Drinking Hitler's Champagne; Berchtesgaden, May 1–8, 1945
 Eighteen – "The Soldier's Dream Life"; Austria, May 9 – July 31, 1945
 Nineteen – "Postwar Careers"; 1945-1991

References

1992 non-fiction books
Books about World War II
Non-fiction books adapted into television shows
Books by Stephen Ambrose
Non-fiction books about the United States Army